Herbert Arthur Bown (3 May 1893 – 1959) was an English footballer who played in the Football League for Halifax Town, Hull City and Leicester City.

References

1893 births
1959 deaths
English footballers
Association football goalkeepers
English Football League players
Leicester City F.C. players
Halifax Town A.F.C. players
Hull City A.F.C. players